William Coole (27 January 1927 – 12 April 2001) was an English professional footballer who played in the Football League for Mansfield Town, Notts County and Barrow.

References

External links
 

English footballers
English Football League players
1925 births
2001 deaths
Mansfield Town F.C. players
Notts County F.C. players
Barrow A.F.C. players
Association football wingers